Alain Caveglia (born 28 March 1968) is a French former professional footballer who played as a striker.

Career
Caveglia was born in Vénissieux, Rhône. A prolific goalscorer, he started at FC Gueugnon, making his Ligue 1 debuts on 21 August 1990 with FC Sochaux-Montbéliard, against Stade Brestois 29. After two more top division seasons at Le Havre AC he moved to Olympique Lyonnais, being eventually named captain on both teams and being affectionately nicknamed Cavégol in the latter.

In January 2000, Caveglia joined FC Nantes, going on to win his only professional silverware in his six-month stint, the season's Coupe de France, gaining a penalty in the last minute of a 2–1 final win over amateurs Calais RUFC which was converted by Antoine Sibierski. In July of that year he returned to Le Havre, going on to amass a further 30 Ligue 2 goals (in 2001–02, his 14 helped the side return to the top flight) and subsequently retiring in June 2002, aged 34.

On 19 August 2011, Caveglia was appointed director of football at Stade Malherbe Caen. He left the club at the end of April 2019, and one month later, he was appointed, still as sporting director, at AS Villers Houlgate Côte Fleurie (ASVH).

Honours
Lyon
UEFA Intertoto Cup: 1997

Nantes
Coupe de France: 1999–2000

References

External links

1968 births
Living people
People from Vénissieux
French footballers
French people of Italian descent
Association football forwards
Ligue 1 players
Ligue 2 players
FC Gueugnon players
FC Sochaux-Montbéliard players
Le Havre AC players
Olympique Lyonnais players
FC Nantes players
Sportspeople from Lyon Metropolis
Footballers from Auvergne-Rhône-Alpes